The Association Sportive Faa'a is a handball club in Papeete, Tahiti. They play in the Tahitian Handball League.

Records

Men
 Oceania Handball Champions Cup
Runners-up - 2009

 Tahitian Handball League - 8 titles
Winners - 1999, 2002, 2008, 2009, 2010, 2011, 2012, 2013

Women
 Tahitian Handball League - 1 titles
Winners - 2013

References

 Team shot & short history (french) 
 League results on AS Faa'a webpage

See also
 Official webpage (French)
 Oceania Continent Handball Federation

Handball clubs
Oceania Handball Clubs
Papeete